Maranoa may refer to several places in Australia:

 Maranoa, Queensland, a region of South West Queensland, Australia
Division of Maranoa, an electoral district in the Australian House of Representatives
Maranoa Region, a local government area in Queensland
Maranoa County, a Cadastral County in Queensland relating to the same area
Maranoa Land District
Maranoa River, a river in the area
 Maranoa Gardens, a park in the Melbourne suburb of Balwyn, Victoria